Untitled Unmastered (stylized as untitled unmastered.) is a compilation album by American rapper Kendrick Lamar. It was released on March 4, 2016, through Top Dawg Entertainment, Aftermath Entertainment and Interscope Records. It consists of previously unreleased demos that originated during the recording of Lamar's album To Pimp a Butterfly (2015), continuing that work's exploration of politically charged and philosophical themes, as well as its experimentation with free jazz, soul, avant-garde music, and funk styles. The album received widespread acclaim from critics, and it debuted atop the US Billboard 200.

Background and release

In December 2014, while preparing for the release of his third album To Pimp a Butterfly (2015), Lamar performed an unreleased, untitled track as a musical guest on the final episode of The Colbert Report. In January 2016, he performed another untitled song on The Tonight Show Starring Jimmy Fallon. Following his acclaimed performance at the 2016's Grammy Awards, which included aspects of another new untitled track, Lamar revealed the existence of a collection of tracks that did not make it onto Butterfly: "I got a chamber of material from the album that I was in love [with] where sample clearances or something as simple as a deadline kept it off the album."

Following hints of a new release from Lamar's label Top Dawg Entertainment, and allegedly aided by NBA player LeBron James's public request to TDE head Anthony Tiffith that Lamar's untitled work be released, Untitled Unmastered first surfaced on Spotify on March 4, 2016 containing eight untitled tracks but without an apparent release date. The project was officially released on the iTunes Store later that day. It spans 34 minutes and features eight untitled tracks, each dated. These dates indicate that the songs were written and recorded at various points between 2013 and 2016. Later  that day, Lamar confirmed that the tracks were unfinished demos from To Pimp a Butterfly. In an interview with Spin, vocalist Anna Wise, while recalling the demos that appear on Untitled Unmastered, claims she knew of the compilation album's existence for an undisclosed amount of time, and was asked to keep it a secret until its release. Untitled Unmastered was released to digital retailers and streaming services on March 4. The physical CD release of its explicit edition followed on March 11 and an edited version was released on March 18. On March 23, 2016, "untitled 07 | levitate" was released separately on iTunes Store as the lone single.

Recording and production
The songs performed during Lamar's appearances on The Colbert Report ("untitled 03 | 05.28.2013.", plus a new coda), The Tonight Show ("untitled 08 | 09.06.2014." plus the end of "untitled 02 | 06.23.2014.") and the end of the 2016 Grammys (part of his first verse from "untitled 05 | 09.21.2014.") were all included on Untitled Unmastered. The Tonight Show performance was previously known as "Untitled 2". Previously, part of Lamar's "untitled 08" verse had been used for remixes of Funkadelic's "Ain't That Funkin Kinda Hard on You". Swizz Beatz has said that his and Alicia Keys' 5-year-old son Egypt produced "untitled 07" and played a large contribution in the productions of "untitled 01" and "untitled 02" through uncredited samples. TDE producer Sounwave has confirmed on Twitter that Egypt produced the second half of the track. "untitled 06 | 06.30.2014" features uncredited vocals from American singer CeeLo Green, while it was produced by both Adrian Younge and Ali Shaheed Muhammad of A Tribe Called Quest. Fuse TV described the album's tracks: "they have no official titles, have fascinating imperfections, and represent Kendrick in his rawest form while shedding insight into his creative development over the last three to four years." According to an interview with Complex, Sounwave mentioned that Kendrick Lamar opted against mastering the tracks of Untitled Unmastered, because Lamar "wanted [Untitled Unmastered] to feel 100 percent authentic." Comparing the unusual nature of the album's presentation to that of Kanye West's The Life of Pablo (2016), The Independent Christopher Hooton wrote that: 'I don't think we should consider this a Kendrick Lamar album in the same way we do Good Kid, M.A.A.D City [sic], TPAB etc, but it definitely feels more formal and considered than a mixtape [...] the whole thing still feels cohesive.'

Music and lyrics
The Boston Globe characterized Untitled Unmastered as "pull[ing] listeners right back into [a] web of jazz-soaked, funk-drunk internal conflict and social commentary," while The Guardian described the album as "filled with the free jazz, funk, politically charged lyrics and experimental sounds that made To Pimp a Butterfly such an instant classic." Tiny Mix Tapes described the album's music as "both ambient yet thrashing, melodic yet radiating, with standout tracks like "untitled 02" and "untitled 07" fully exhibiting Lamar’s vertiginous flows and adept ear for exciting, tuneful, next-level rap production." The Chicago Tribune also observed the "soul, spoken word and avant-garde music that permeated [Butterfly]," noting that "the tracks favor upright bass, skittering drums and horn textures as much as loops and samples [while] Lamar employs a range of vocalists, from SZA and CeeLo Green to augment his typically dense, diamond-hard rhymes." Lyrically, the release furthers Lamar's exploration of psychological and politically charged ideas, with references to spirituality and race featured throughout. Drowned in Sound also noted the thematic interplay between sexuality and oppression present in the release.

"Untitled 01" was described by NME as an "unashamedly apocalyptic opening," while The Guardian described it as "vividly, cinematically drawn, its descriptions of towers crumbling, oceans drying and rapists fleeing – as well as its promise of an end to war, discrimination and superficiality – capture terror and justice in equal measure." Tiny Mix Tapes characterized the track as "a hallucinatory odyssey through the psyche of a conflicted young man," with production that "complements Lamar’s dark narrative perfectly, with the bass often sounding like it’s sizzling up from under the intoxicating beat." The following track, "untitled 02", was characterized by NME as "a chin-stroking track about faith, gifts from God and the ostentatious material indulgence of his peers, that incorporates "faint saxophone squalls and cloying synths," while The Guardian noted Lamar's vocal experimentation, with him "push[ing] his timbre into an ancient-sounding quaver before seizing the shifting sands of the beat with relish for a bravura final rap verse." The chant "Pimp pimp!... Hooray" on this track is the first mention of an album-spanning refrain. On "untitled 03," Lamar pursues a "loose concept of Afrofuturism [..] which he briefly collides head-on with Eastern philosophies and contemporary inner-city living." The track pits "the utopian vision [..] ostensibly based around black identity [with] the possibility of a much bleaker dystopian society." "Untitled 04", the shortest track on the album, is filled with feverish whispers, with empowering, pro-education message.

"Untitled 05" is a thicket of hi-hat percussion and saxophone, a piano glissando from Robert Glasper, a vocal from Anna Wise and guest raps from Jay Rock and Lamar's TDE manager Punch. It discusses treatment of and expectations for minorities in the US. Lamar's performance at the 2016 Grammy Awards found him rhyming over L.A. singer-producer Iman Omari's "Omari's Mood"; that beat, in slightly altered form, is the basis of "Untitled 05". "Untitled 06" has a smooth bossa nova and jazz-funk groove, marked by xylophone and flute, and a lush chorus from Cee-Lo. In the track, Lamar seems to be addressing a girl he's trying to impress, but some lines seem to show him plagued by self-doubt. "Pimp pimp... Hooray!" – also the final line of the whole album – makes its return on "Untitled 07", a three-part 8-minute song, glides easily from a trap-influenced call to "levitate," and a wordless choral melody, to Lamar's broadsides against his competitors, before closing with tape hiss and studio chatter. Musically, critics compared "untitled 08" (unofficially known as "Blue Faces"), with "King Kunta", for its hydraulic-pumping synthesized bass thump and Lamar's slangy flow. The song counters feelings of futility and hopelessness with optimism, suggesting there may be hope after all.

Release and reception 

Untitled Unmastered received widespread acclaim from critics. At Metacritic, which assigns a normalized rating out of 100 to reviews from mainstream publications, the album received an average score of 86, based on 31 reviews. Evan Rytlewski of The A.V. Club wrote that "although Untitled begs to be graded on a curve, it doesn’t need to be. Leftovers or not, this is magnificent music from a rare talent working at peak creativity." Writing for Tiny Mix Tapes, Brooklyn Russell stated that "whether rhythmically bustling or meditative, these eight previously unreleased demos from the Butterfly sessions seethe with Lamar’s still-startling visions and artistic ambitions." Writing for The Guardian, Alex Macpherson thought the album "is collection whose understatement allows different facets of Lamar’s talent to shine." Greg Kot of Chicago Tribune wrote that his songs "openly struggle with issues of race and racism, identity and self-worth, the desire to possess the world or destroy it. We are all works in progress, he suggests -- unstable, volatile, ever-changing. Why should a collection of songs be any different?"

Kellan Miller, writing for Drowned in Sound, observed that "Kendrick’s experimental hankering is constantly in flux. He spends the entirety of the record fusing seemingly disparate parts and wafting between snippets of ideas," ultimately asserting that "the Compton native’s appeal can be spliced in illimitable categories, but the conclusion is always his art's untamed, almost psychotic brilliance. In The Boston Globe, Julian Benbow noted: "In a way, it’s all as tightly woven as his Grammy-winning work, even if none of these cuts fit that album’s meticulous narrative." In NME, Larry Bartleet opined "there are few unfamiliar messages and it’s all dense and considered, but never overwrought or explicitly angry. What really emerges is Kendrick's nuanced worldview." Will Hermes of Rolling Stone concluded his review writing "there's brilliance in even Lamar's cast-offs, and an intimacy here that makes this more than just a gift for his ravenous fans."

Untitled Unmastered debuted at number one on the US Billboard 200, earning 178,000 album-equivalent units for the week ending March 10, 2016. 142,000 came from traditional album sales. The compilation album gave Lamar his second chart-topping set in less than a year. It has sold 205,000 copies domestically as of April 30, 2016.

Track listing

Notes
  signifies an additional producer.
 All tracks stylized in all lowercase letters.
 "Untitled 01 | 08.19.2014." features additional vocals by Bilal and Anna Wise. 
 "Untitled 03 | 05.28.2013." features additional vocals by Bilal and Mani Strings.
 "Untitled 04 | 08.14.2014." features additional vocals by Rocket and SZA.
 "Untitled 05 | 09.21.2014." features verses by Punch and Jay Rock and additional vocals by Bilal, SZA, and Anna Wise.
 "Untitled 06 | 06.30.2014." features additional vocals by Cee Lo.
 "Untitled 07 | 2014 – 2016" features additional vocals by Egypt and SZA.
 "Untitled 08 | 09.06.2014." features additional vocals by Thundercat.

Personnel
Credits adapted from official liner notes
 Dominic Angelella – additional keys (track 1)
 Taz Arnold – ending skit (track 7)
 Astronote – production (track 3)
 Joe Baldacci – drums (track 1), drum engineering (track 1)
 Bilal – additional vocals (tracks 1, 3, 5)
 Cardo – production (tracks 2, 7)
 Egypt – production (track 7), additional vocals (track 7)
 Cee Lo – additional vocals (track 6)
 Frank Dukes – production (track 7)
 Jay Rock – verse (track 5)
 Kendrick Lamar – lead artist, production (track 4)
 Josef Leimberg – added trumpet (track 5)
 Mani Strings – additional vocals (track 3)
 Terrace Martin – production (track 5), saxophone (track 2), keys (track 4), additional keys (track 2)
 Mono/Poly – production (track 8)
 Ali Shaheed Muhammad – production (track 6)
 Punch – additional vocals (track 5)
 Ritz Reynolds – production (track 1)
 Rocket – additional vocals (track 4)
 Sounwave – production (tracks 4, 5), added drums (track 1)
 SZA – additional vocals (tracks 4, 5, 7)
 Thundercat – production (tracks 4, 8), additional production (track 2), bass (tracks 2, 5, 7), additional vocals (track 8)
 Anna Wise – additional vocals (tracks 1, 5)
 Adrian Younge – production (track 6)
 Yung Exclusive – production (tracks 2, 7)

Charts

Weekly charts

Year-end charts

Certifications

Release history

See also
 List of number-one albums of 2016 (Canada)
 List of Billboard 200 number-one albums of 2016
 List of Billboard number-one R&B/hip-hop albums of 2016

References

External links
 

2016 compilation albums
Aftermath Entertainment compilation albums
Albums produced by Cardo
Albums produced by DJ Khalil
Albums produced by Frank Dukes
Albums produced by Hit-Boy
Albums produced by Sounwave
Albums produced by Swizz Beatz
Albums produced by Thundercat (musician)
Albums produced by Tae Beast
Demo albums
Interscope Records compilation albums
Kendrick Lamar albums
Top Dawg Entertainment albums